Sanjoy Kumar Mitter (born 1933) is a Professor in the Department of Electrical Engineering and Computer Science at MIT who is a noted control theorist.  He has received both the Richard E. Bellman Control Heritage Award from the American Automatic Control Council (2007) and the IEEE Control Systems Award (in 2000).  In 1988 he was elected a member of the National Academy of Engineering "for outstanding contributions to the theory and applications of automatic control and nonlinear filtering".

Biography
Sanjoy K. Mitter was born in 1933 in Calcutta, India. He received a B.Sc. and Ph.D. from Imperial College of Science and Technology, London. He taught at Case Western Reserve University from 1965 to 1969 and joined MIT in 1969. His research has been concerned with Systems, Control and Communication. He has furnished proofs in nonlinear filtering and optimal control theory, as well as carrying out more applied work in image analysis, computation of optimal controls and reliability of electrical power systems. He was director for both the Center for Intelligent Control and the Laboratory for Information and Decision Systems.

Mitter lives in Cambridge, Massachusetts.

References

External links
 Home page at MIT ESD
 Home page at MIT EECS
 

1933 births
21st-century American engineers
Control theorists
MIT School of Engineering faculty
Richard E. Bellman Control Heritage Award recipients
Living people
Members of the United States National Academy of Engineering